Marcelów may refer to the following places:
Marcelów, Bełchatów County in Łódź Voivodeship (central Poland)
Marcelów, Zduńska Wola County in Łódź Voivodeship (central Poland)
Marcelów, Gmina Jedlińsk in Masovian Voivodeship (east-central Poland)
Marcelów, Gmina Pionki in Masovian Voivodeship (east-central Poland)